Monjur Ahmed Bacchu Mia (died on 17 February 2019) was a Bangladeshi politician in the 'Bangladeshi Awami League'. In 1970, he was elected as an MP. He was a freedom fighter. He served as a Jatiya Sangsad member for the now-defunct Mymensingh-31 constituency in 1972–1973.

References

2019 deaths
People from Kishoreganj District
Awami League politicians
1st Jatiya Sangsad members
People of the Bangladesh Liberation War
Place of birth missing
Year of birth missing